The Sabail FK 2020–21 season was Sabail's fourth Azerbaijan Premier League season, and their fifth season in existence. They finished the season eighth in the Premier League and reached the Quarterfinals of the Azerbaijan Cup.

Season events
On 17 July, Sabail announced a new contract had been signed with Head Coach Aftandil Hajiyev for the 2020/2021 season.

On 20 July, Sabail announced that they had agreed new one-year contracts with Rauf Aliyev, Lema Mabidi, Kamal Bayramov, Orkhan Gurbanli, Peyman Keshavarz, Elchin Rahimli, Adil Naghiyev and Bahadur Haziyev.

On 23 July, Rahid Amirguliyev extended his contract with Sabail until the end of the 2020–21 season.

On 3 September, Sabail announced the signing of Afran Ismayilov. The following day, 4 September, Sabail announced the signing of Nicholas Hagen to a one-year contract.

On 18 September, Sabail announced the signing of Amil Yunanov.

On 30 September, Sabail's match against Qarabağ scheduled for 4 October was postponed to allow Azerbaijan additional preparation time for their upcoming UEFA Nations League matches.

On 14 November, Sabail announced the signing of Iranian international Bakhtiar Rahmani on a contract until the end of the season.

On 8 January, Sabail announced that Bakhtiar Rahmani had left the club after his contract by mutual consent, with Elgun Nabiyev leaving a day later by the same manner.

On 19 January, Sabail announced the signing of Luka Imnadze on a contract until the end of the season.

On 30 January, Sabail announced the signing of Milovan Petrovikj on a contract until the end of the season.

On 31 January, Sabail announced the signing of Alie Sesay on a contract until the end of the season.

Squad

Transfers

In

Loans in

Out

Released

Friendlies

Competitions

Overview

Premier League

Results summary

Results by round

Results

League table

Azerbaijan Cup

Squad statistics

Appearances and goals

|-
|colspan="14"|Players away from Sabail on loan:
|-
|colspan="14"|Players who left Sabail during the season:

|}

Goal scorers

Clean sheets

Disciplinary record

References

Sabail FK
Azerbaijani football clubs 2020–21 season